Tournament of Elements is the fourth season of the computer-animated television series Ninjago: Masters of Spinjitzu (titled Ninjago from the eleventh season onward). The series was created by Michael Hegner and Tommy Andreasen. The season aired from 23 February to 3 April 2015, following the third season titled Rebooted. It is succeeded by the fifth season, titled Possession.

The fourth season follows the storyline of the ninja searching for Zane by competing in Master Chen's Tournament of Elements. The season introduces Master Chen as the main antagonist and also several Elemental Masters into the series, who each have individual elemental powers, such as amber, shadow and smoke. The season marked the first time that two seasons were released in one year, replacing the previous schedule of one season released per year.

Voice cast

Main 
 Jillian Michaels as Lloyd Garmadon, the Green Ninja
 Vincent Tong as Kai, the red ninja and Elemental Master of Fire
 Michael Adamthwaite as Jay, the blue ninja and Elemental Master of Lightning
 Brent Miller as Zane, the white/titanium ninja and Elemental Master of Ice
 Kirby Morrow as Cole, the black ninja and Elemental Master of Earth
 Kelly Metzger as Nya, Kai's sister
 Paul Dobson as Sensei Wu, the wise teacher of the ninja
 Mark Oliver as Sensei Garmadon
Jennifer Hayward as P.I.X.A.L. a female nindroid
Ian James Corlett as Master Chen/Tox

Supporting 

 Heather Doerksen as Skylor
 Scott McNeil as Karlof/General Arcturus
 Doron Bell Jr. as Griffin Turner
 Kirby Morrow as Paleman/Gravis (episode 37) 
 Andrew Francis as Shade (Shadow)
 Scott McNeil as Clouse
 Kathleen Barr as Misako
 Mark Oliver as Mistaké/Gravis
 Michael Dobson as Pythor P. Chumsworth
Michael Adamthwaite as Bolobo
Brent Miller as Ash
Paul Dobson as Jacob Pevsner/Warden Noble/Rufus McCallister/Neuro
Lee Tockar as Cyrus Borg
Brian Drummond as Nuckal/Kruncha
Alan Marriott as Dareth/Captain Soto
 Maryke Handrikese as Camille
 Alessandro Juliani as Kapau
Ian Hanlin as Chope
Michael Donovan as Eyezor
 Brian Dobson as Sumo Zumo

Production

Development 
Writers Dan and Kevin Hageman have stated that the season was inspired by the 1973 martial arts film Enter the Dragon. The director of the film Robert Clouse was also the inspiration for the character Clouse, an antagonist in the season.

Animation 
The animation for the fourth season was produced at Wil Film ApS in Denmark.

Direction 
The Tournament of Elements episodes were directed by Jens Møller, Michael Helmuth Hansen, Peter Hausner, Per Düring Risager and Trylle Vilstrup.

Release 
The season premiered on Cartoon Network on 23 February 2015 with the release of The Invitation. The subsequent episodes were released across March and April 2015 until the release of the season finale titled The Corridor of Elders on 3 April of the same year.

Plot 
Following the loss of Zane, the team splits apart, but Lloyd seeks to rebuild it. The ninja are reunited at Chen's Noodle House, where they discover that Zane is alive and are invited to compete in a tournament by Master Chen. Garmadon and the ninja join a group of Elemental Masters and Chen's second-in-command, Clouse, on board a ferry. On Chen's island, Zane is being held prisoner and is now the Titanium Ninja. Upon arrival, Kai falls in love with Skylor, the Elemental Master of Amber, and tries to impress her. The competitors compete to obtain Jade Blades to remain in the contest, while the losers are dropped into trap doors. The ninja discover a secret tunnel which reveals Chen's Cultist Warriors. When Jay and Cole are forced to compete against each other, Cole allows Jay to win, and the two end their debate over Nya for good. He is put to work in Chen's Noodle Factory, but plans to escape.

The ninja gain the trust of the Elemental Masters during a race between Lloyd and Camille, the Elemental Master of Form. When Lloyd wins the race, Chen tries to change the results, but the ninja are supported by the Elemental Masters. Chen attempts to weaken the alliance by claiming that the winner will obtain the Staff of Elements, which he is secretly using to absorb their elemental powers. Dareth and Nya infiltrate the tournament, with Nya disguised as a kabuki, while Cole finds Zane and releases him. The ninja realise that one of the Elemental Masters is a spy for Chen. It is later revealed that Skylor is not only the spy, but Chen's daughter.

In the next contest, Chen sends the contestants to a jungle island to capture Nya. In the jungle, Kai and Skylor team up, but Skylor reveals herself as Chen's daughter and everyone aside from Garmadon, Lloyd, and Nya are captured. Chen offers Kai greater power if he betrays the ninja and Kai pretends to switch sides. When Lloyd is captured, Kai uses an opportune moment to take the Staff of Elements, which begins to corrupt him, but he manages to destroy it, which restores all of the elemental powers. In the jungle, Clouse and Garmadon fight, resulting in Garmadon throwing Clouse into a portal to the Cursed Realm. Chen and his army escape from the island but are pursued by the ninja and Elemental Masters riding on their elemental dragons. 

When Chen performs a spell to transform his army into Anacondrai warriors, he realises that to make the spell permanent, he needs the essence of a true Anacondrai. As Pythor is the last remaining Anacondrai, he is captured by Chen, who uses his sweat to complete the spell. Chen and his army then wage war against Ninjago. A battle takes place at the Corridor of Elders, between the ninja alliance and Chen's army. Pythor reveals to Garmadon that the only way to defeat Chen's army is for Garmadon to banish himself to the Cursed Realm to bring back the original Anacondrai generals. Garmadon accepts, resulting in the spirits of the Anacondrai generals banishing Chen and his army to the Cursed Realm. A single spirit flies out of the portal to the Cursed Realm, uttering the name "Morro".

Episodes

Reception

Ratings 
Tournament of Elements continued the popularity of the preceding seasons of Ninjago: Masters of Spinjitzu. Its Monday 6.30pm time slot was the top telecast of the day among boys aged 2–11 and 6–11, and it was the top telecast in its time period among children aged 2–11, 6–11 and all boys.

Critical reception 
Reviewer Melissa Camacho for Common Sense Media gave Tournament of Elements a 3 out of 5 star rating and noted that the season contains "lots of action-packed fantasy violence". The reviewer opined, "This colorful, fast-paced action series features the teen Ninja making sense of loss as they continue to learn lessons about loyalty and teamwork. It also highlights the importance of fighting with a sense of morality behind it, which is an interesting angle for an animated show based on toys."

Other media 
An associated action game titled Lego Ninjago: Tournament was released on 23 January 2015 for IOS, which was developed by The Lego Group.

Five mini-movies were released in June and July 2015 on the Lego YouTube channel to accompany the season, which focus on the main antagonist, Master Chen. The mini-movies were produced by Wil Film ApS and were titled Chairful What You Wish For, Chen's New Chair, Chair Play Chen, Chair Up Chen and Bad Chair Day.

See also 

 Lloyd Garmadon

References

Primary

Secondary 

Tournament of Elements
2015 Canadian television seasons
2015 Danish television seasons